NGC 6584 is a globular cluster in the constellation Telescopium that lies near Theta Arae and is 45000 light-years distant. It is an Oosterhoff type I cluster, and contains at least 69 variable stars, most of which are RR Lyrae variables: 46 stars were identified as RRab variables; 15 as RRc variables, 1 RRe variable, 4 eclipsing binaries and 3 long period variables. NGC 6584 is about 4 kpc from the Galactic center and about 2.7 kpc from the Galactic plane.

As is typical for metal-poor globular clusters, NGC 6584 has an enhanced concentration of alpha elements relative to iron.

References

External links 
 

 
Globular clusters
6584